Shashrika Pussegolla (born 14 July 1987) is a Sri Lankan cricketer. He made his first-class debut for Saracens Sports Club in the 2008–09 Premier Trophy on 14 November 2008.

References

External links
 

1987 births
Living people
Sri Lankan cricketers
Chilaw Marians Cricket Club cricketers
Nondescripts Cricket Club cricketers
Ragama Cricket Club cricketers
Saracens Sports Club cricketers
Cricketers from Colombo